Bretzelsonndeg, or pretzel Sunday, is a national feast day in the country of Luxembourg, celebrated by eating (often sweet) pretzels on the third Sunday in Lent, and allegedly dating back to the 18th century. The traditional story holds that men offer their (female) sweethearts a pretzel, and if the woman is inclined to accept his offer of love, she will give him an egg on Easter Sunday. In leap years, apparently, the roles are reversed.

See also
 List of food days

References

Luxembourgian cuisine
Pretzels
Observances about food and drink